Psilocybe subtropicalis is a species of mushroom in the family Hymenogastraceae. The mushroom contains the psychoactive compound psilocybin. Found in Mexico, it was described as new to science by mycologist and Psilocybe authority Gastón Guzmán in 1995.

See also
List of Psilocybin mushrooms
Psilocybin mushrooms
Psilocybe

References

Entheogens
Fungi described in 1995
Fungi of North America
Psychoactive fungi
subtropicalis
Psychedelic tryptamine carriers
Taxa named by Gastón Guzmán